MSRA may stand for:
Macrophage scavenger receptor class A, a receptor found in macrophages
New York Metropolitan Squash Racquets Association, which organizes leagues, tournaments and other events for squash players in the New York Metropolitan area
Mid-States Rodeo Association,
Michigan Shipwreck Research Associates
Peptide-methionine (S)-S-oxide reductase, an enzyme
MSRA (gene), a family of enzymes
Microsoft Research Asia, Microsoft Research's major lab in China
Microsoft  Remote Assistance, a software application in Microsoft Windows